"Some Kind of Love" is a song by American rock band the Killers for their fifth studio album Wonderful Wonderful (2017). It was released on September 15, 2017 as the album's second promotional single. The song is directed to Brandon Flowers' wife and features additional vocals by the Flowers' three sons.

Background and release
The Killers' frontman Brandon Flowers has stated that once he started writing personal songs for the band's upcoming album Wonderful Wonderful, he began to second-guess himself, and so, he decided to play some of them to his wife Tana, who suffers from PTSD: "I'd never done anything like that before, where we'd sit down and play the songs for her, and explain it, and see if it made sense to her, and got her approval". He mentioned "Some Kind of Love" as the track that "struck a chord" with her as he wrote it particularly to lift his wife's spirits.

It was released as the second promotional single from the album on September 15, 2017 through digital retailers and streaming services.

Composition
"Some Kind of Love" is a synth-pop, dream pop and art pop song composed by Brandon Flowers and Jacknife Lee. It contains interpolations from Brian Eno's "An Ending (Ascent)", which was the main inspiration for the song. According to Flowers, the band asked for his permission to sample the song in their 2006 album Sam's Town, but he declined. Despite being rejected, Flowers was determined ever since he had a dream about him. After Bono and Anton Corbijn texted and e-mailed Eno, Flowers was finally able to talk to him: "What we found out is that he'd told his manager, 'I don't want to use this song anymore'. He didn't know a band was gonna try to sing on it. I told him the story about the dream, and it was pretty funny. He gave his seal of approval, and he likes it." Flowers also revealed that the song contains his three sons as backing vocals, which caused his wife Tana to cry once she heard it: "It's really emotional. I played that for her, and she just sobbed. But I'm proud of that one."

Critical reception
"Some Kind of Love" received mixed to positive reviews from music critics. Rolling Stone's Rory Crow described the song as "an almost ethereal meditation on love". Lisa Nguyen from Paste Magazine noted the track is "a delicate lullaby compared to all the punchy singles we've heard so far from the forthcoming album". However, Stereogums Pranav Trewn called it "the most boring song Chris Martin never wrote", stating the track "just plods along without ever justifying the amount of space it takes up".

Credits and personnel
Credits adapted from Tidal.

Recording locations
 Recorded at 11th Street Records (Las Vegas, Nevada), The Garage (Topanga, California), and Battle Born Studios (Las Vegas, Nevada)
 Mastered at Metropolis (London)

PersonnelThe Killers Brandon Flowers – vocals, keys
 Mark Stoermer – fretless bass
 Ronnie Vannucci Jr. – drumsAdditional personnel'
 Matt Bishop – recording engineering 
 Malcolm Harrison – assistant recording engineering 
 Jacknife Lee – guitar, keyboards, production, programming, recording engineering, mixing
 Robert Root – recording engineering

Release history

References

2017 songs
The Killers songs
Songs written by Brandon Flowers
Songs written by Jacknife Lee
American synth-pop songs
Dream pop songs
Art pop songs
Songs written by Brian Eno